Eduardo Portela Marín (born 1934 in Barcelona, Catalonia, Spain) is a Spanish former basketball player, former basketball coach, and basketball executive. He is the former head of the ACB, the governing body of the top-tier level Spanish professional club basketball league, and the former head of ULEB, the Union of European Leagues of Basketball.

Basketball management career
Portela, along with Jose Antonio Gasca, founded the ACB. The ACB has since organized Spain's top-tier professional club basketball league, the Liga ACB, since the 1983–84 season. He became the ACB's President in 1990. He served as the President of the ACB from 1990 to 2011, and also as its honorary president.

In 1991, he was also one of the founders of ULEB, the Union of European Leagues of Basketball, along with Gianluigi Porelli. In 1998, he became the President of the Union, a position he held until 2016, when he became the Honorary President.

References

External links
Euroleague.net interview: Eduardo Portela, ULEB president at Euroleague.net

1934 births
Living people
FC Barcelona Bàsquet coaches
Basketball executives